Karamo Karega Brown (born November 2, 1980) is an American television host, reality television personality, author, actor, and activist. Brown began his career in 2004 on the MTV reality show The Real World: Philadelphia, becoming the first openly gay black man cast on a reality show. He currently stars as the culture expert in the Netflix series Queer Eye.

In September 2022, Brown began hosting an eponymous talk show titled Karamo for NBCUniversal.

Personal life 
Brown was born in Houston, Texas and has three older sisters. He is of Jamaican and Cuban descent. He came out as gay at age 15. Brown grew up in Coral Springs, Florida and graduated from Marjory Stoneman Douglas High School in Parkland in 1999. Following the shooting at the school in 2018, Brown became an active member of the Never Again MSD movement started by the students, advocating for new gun control legislation. He graduated from Florida A&M University, a historically black university, and worked in social services for nearly a decade after The Real World.

In 2007, Brown was notified that he was the father of a ten-year-old boy, Jason, receiving custody of him that year. Brown adopted Jason's half-brother Chris in 2010. Brown moved to Los Angeles with his two sons in 2011 where they currently reside. In May 2018, Brown became engaged to his partner of eight years, director Ian Jordan. They split amicably around June 2020.

Career 
Karamo was most known for his television debut on the MTV reality series The Real World: Philadelphia in 2004, becoming the first out gay black man on reality TV. He later competed in the Real World/Road Rules Challenge: The Inferno II, where he was eliminated in episode six.

Brown made a return to reality television on TV One's The Next 15 in 2016, which followed him and five other reality stars. Brown was a contributing host on HLN's Dr. Drew On Call, YouTube's The Young Turks, served as host and producer of HuffPost Live for Huffington Post and as a recurring guest host of Access Hollywood Live. In 2014, Brown became a host and segment producer for the Own Show.

Brown hosted MTV's Are You The One: Second Chances. Brown is the culture expert in the Netflix revival of Queer Eye. The first season was released on Netflix in February 2018.

Brown published a memoir in March 2019 titled Karamo: My Story of Embracing Purpose, Healing, and Hope. In June 2019, Brown appeared in Taylor Swift's "You Need to Calm Down" music video.

In 2019 Brown competed on the 28th season of celebrity dance competition Dancing with the Stars. He was paired with professional dancer Jenna Johnson. Brown and Johnson were the fourth couple eliminated. Another competitor on the show was former Trump White House press secretary Sean Spicer, who was seen as a divisive and controversial choice. Brown publicly came to "defend" him "calling him 'a good guy' and 'a friend.' He even said that he 'was proud of him.' " Brown was criticized by many, including author Roxane Gay for normalizing Spicer and his work in the White House. Brown said he did not appreciate Spicer serving as a mouthpiece for many lies in service of Trump. His trailer at DWTS shared a wall with him; Brown strategically had transgender friends over, and invited Spicer to socialize. Later he would tell Spicer how the actions and policies against LGBTQ rights affect those people. Brown explained he felt he could connect with Spicer as “he has the capacity to find out where others are coming from and to help them become more open-minded and educated."

Starting in 2018, Brown shared some of his best advice about promoting self-esteem to students at multiple universities.

In November 2019, Brown's children's book, I Am Perfectly Designed, written with Jason "Rachel" Brown and illustrated by Anoosha Syed, was published by Henry Holt.  Jason said that the title of the book stemmed from Brown always saying it to Jason growing up.

In 2020, Karamo Brown teamed up with Honest Company alumni to create MANTL, a premium personal care brand for bald and or balding men.

In 2020, Brown was named to the Ebony Power 100 List.

He judged an episode of Is It Cake?, which premiered on Netflix in March 2022.

Brown guest-hosted several episodes of Maury in the 2021–22 season. In March 2022, Brown was announced as host Maury Povich's successor; Povich retired and Brown hosted a new talk show for NBCUniversal Television Distribution, with Karamo starting recording in August and premiering September 19.

Activism 
In 2014, Brown partnered with the pharmaceutical company Janssen as part of the Positively Fearless campaign to empower the gay and bisexual community.

In 2015, Brown co-founded 6in10.org, an organization that works to combat HIV stigma and provides mental health support and HIV education to the black LGBT community. Karamo volunteers as a youth counselor at the Los Angeles LGBT Center. Brown has also partnered with the Centers for Disease Control and Prevention and the National Black Justice Coalition as their health and wellness ambassador. It was primarily focused on the Black LGBTQ community due to the fact that Brown felt as if that community specifically got overlooked most of the time. Their mission was to eradicate the 6 in 10 HIV statistic plaguing gay and bisexual Black men by providing tailored mental health support.

He was invited by the Obama Administration to work with the White House to create policies and legislations that helped with supporting the aspiring LGBTQ youth and their community along with their allies after school hours. He worked directly with President Barack Obama to support the president Obama Foundation and the My Brother’s Keeper Alliance.

In April 2018, he joined Creative Coalition members in traveling to Capitol Hill to petition legislators and the office of Second Lady Karen Pence for increased funding for the National Endowment for the Arts. He is also a national co-chair for Health Care Voter. Brown's activism does not remain local; he travels around the country to speak and host focus groups with HIV organizations, churches, and schools to address the issues the LGBTQ community is facing.

Awards and honors
 2018 Human Rights Campaign Visibility Award
 2020 Primetime Emmy Award Nominated for Outstanding Host for a Reality or Competition Program

Filmography

Television and web

Film

References

External links

 

1980 births
Florida A&M University alumni
Living people
American gay actors
LGBT African Americans
LGBT people from Florida
LGBT people from Texas
People from Houston
The Real World (TV series) cast members
The Challenge (TV series) contestants
American people of Cuban descent
American people of Jamaican descent
People from Coral Springs, Florida
African-American male actors
21st-century African-American people
20th-century African-American people
Television personalities from Texas
Television personalities from Florida